Hexachlorocyclohexane (HCH), is any of several polyhalogenated organic compounds consisting of a six-carbon ring with one chlorine and one hydrogen attached to each carbon. This structure has nine stereoisomers (eight diastereomers, one of which has two enantiomers), which differ by the stereochemistry of the individual chlorine substituents on the cyclohexane. It is sometimes erroneously called "benzene hexachloride" (BHC). They have been used as models for analyzing the effects of different geometric positions of the large atoms with dipolar bonds on the stability of the cyclohexane conformation. The isomers are poisonous, pesticidal, and persistent organic pollutants, to varying degrees.

Hexachlorocyclohexane was dimerized to produce mirex, a banned pesticide.

Common forms are:
 alpha-hexachlorocyclohexane, α-HCH, or α-BHC, the optically active isomer
 beta-hexachlorocyclohexane, β-HCH, or β-BHC
 gamma-hexachlorocyclohexane, γ-HCH, γ-BHC, or lindane, the most insecticidal isomer
 delta-hexachlorocyclohexane, δ-HCH, or δ-BHC
 technical hexachlorocyclohexane, t-HCH, or t-BHC, a mixture of isomers

Chlorination of benzene under electrophilic aromatic substitution conditions (Cl2/FeCl3 or Cl2/AlCl3) produces chlorobenzene. Since mono chloro-de-hydrogenation deactivates the molecule against further electrophilic reactions, the reaction can be halted at one chlorine atom substitution.
 Electrophilic chlorination: C6H6 + Cl2 → C6H5Cl + HCl

In contrast, chlorination of benzene under radical addition conditions (Cl2, hν (photochlorination) or Cl2, Δ, high P) yields hexachlorocyclohexane isomers after three successive radical dichlorination steps. Addition rather than substitution takes place, due to the very high C–H bond dissociation energy (112 kcal/mol) that disfavors abstraction of a hydrogen atom. Addition of Cl2 destroys the aromaticity of the benzene ring, and the addition of two more Cl2 molecules is rapid compared to the first. Hence, only thrice-dichlorinated product can be isolated from this reaction.
 Radical addition: C6H6 + 3Cl2 → C6H6Cl6

Hexachlorocyclohexane isomers with more than one chlorine atom per carbon are:
1,1,2,3,4,5-hexachlorocyclohexane
1,1,2,3,4,6-hexachlorocyclohexane
1,1,2,3,5,6-hexachlorocyclohexane
1,1,2,2,3,4-hexachlorocyclohexane
1,1,2,2,3,5-hexachlorocyclohexane
1,1,2,2,3,6-hexachlorocyclohexane
1,1,2,2,4,5-hexachlorocyclohexane
1,1,2,3,3,4-hexachlorocyclohexane
1,1,2,3,3,5-hexachlorocyclohexane
1,1,2,3,4,4-hexachlorocyclohexane
1,1,3,3,5,5-hexachlorocyclohexane
1,1,2,4,4,5-hexachlorocyclohexane
1,1,2,4,4,6-hexachlorocyclohexane
1,1,2,4,5,5-hexachlorocyclohexane
1,1,2,5,6,6-hexachlorocyclohexane
1,1,2,2,3,3-hexachlorocyclohexane
1,1,2,2,4,4-hexachlorocyclohexane
1,1,3,3,5,5-hexachlorocyclohexane

References

External links
Hexachlorocyclohexane (HCH), CDC

Organochlorides
Pesticides